Dasht Gorgan or Dasht-e Goran may refer to:
The Gorgan Plain in Golestan Province
 Gonbad-e Kavus city
 Dasht-e Gorgan, Khuzestan
 Dasht Gorgan, North Khorasan

See also
 Gorganrud River